The canton of L'Aigle-Est is a former canton of France, located in the Orne department, in the Basse-Normandie region. It was disbanded following the French canton reorganisation which came into effect in March 2015. It had 9 communes.

Communes
The communes of the canton of L'Aigle-Est were:
 L'Aigle (partly)
 Chandai
 Crulai
 Irai
 Saint-Martin-d'Écublei
 Saint-Michel-Tuboeuf
 Saint-Ouen-sur-Iton
 Saint-Sulpice-sur-Risle
 Vitrai-sous-Laigle

See also
 Cantons of the Orne department

References

Former cantons of Orne
2015 disestablishments in France
States and territories disestablished in 2015